Keshit Rural District is a rural district (dehestan) in Golbaf District, Kerman County, Kerman Province, Iran. At the 2006 census, its population was 2,055, in 481 families. The rural district has 5 villages.

References 

Rural Districts of Kerman Province
Kerman County